"Pick It Up" is a song by American rapper Redman recorded for his third album Muddy Waters (1996). The song was released as the third and final single for the album on May 13, 1997.

Track listing
12" vinyl
"Pick It Up" (radio) – 3:55
"Pick It Up" (LP version) – 3:59
"Pick It Up" (instrumental) – 3:59
"Yesh Yesh Y'all" (radio) – 3:55
"Yesh Yesh Y'all" (instrumental) – 3:59

Chart performance

Notes

External links

1997 singles
Redman (rapper) songs
Song recordings produced by Erick Sermon
Def Jam Recordings singles
1996 songs
Songs written by Erick Sermon
Songs written by Redman (rapper)